Scrooby was a railway station on the Great Northern Railway running between Retford and Doncaster. The station served the small village of Scrooby until closed in 1931, though an excursion stopped in 1938. Sunday trains ended in 1924. In 1897 it had a booking office, waiting room, stationmaster's house, signal box and 5 passenger trains a day each way, but no goods facilities. About 1978 the signal box was replaced by Doncaster power box.

The area was also famous for the water troughs on the line from about 1903 to about 1969.

Present day 
The station survives today as a private house.

References 

Disused railway stations in Nottinghamshire
Former Great Northern Railway stations
Railway stations in Great Britain opened in 1849
Railway stations in Great Britain closed in 1931
Scrooby
1849 establishments in England